The Robinson family may refer to:
Robinson family (Neighbours), a fictional family on the Australian soap opera Neighbours
Robinson family (Sesame Street), a fictional family on the PBS children's series Sesame Street
The Swiss Family Robinson, a Swiss novel (1812) by Johann David Wyss, with many adaptations
The Swiss Family Robinson: Flone of the Mysterious Island, an anime series produced by Nippon Animation

See also
Robinson (disambiguation)
Robinson (name)
Mr. Robinson (disambiguation)